Robert Gutierrez may refer to:
Staff Sgt. Robert Gutierrez, a decorated USAF Combat Controller
ODM (Robert Gutierrez), member of the American hip hop duo A Lighter Shade of Brown